The Road is a 2006 novel by the American author Cormac McCarthy.

The Road may also refer to:

Film and television
The Road (1957 film), a Taiwanese film and winner of the Golden Horse Award for Best Feature Film
The Road (1959 film), a Hong Kong film directed by Ng Wui
First Night: "The Road", a 1963 BBC TV Play by Nigel Kneale
The Road (1964 TV play), an Australian remake of Kneale's play
The Road, a 2018 BBC radio version of Kneale's play, adapted by Toby Hadoke
The Road (1964 TV play), an Australian remake of Kneale's play
 The Road (2001 film), a Kazakh film
 The Road (2009 film), an adaptation of the McCarthy novel, directed by John Hillcoat
 The Road (2011 film), a Filipino film
 The Road (2015 film), a Lebanese film
 La Strada, literally "The Road", a 1954 film by Federico Fellini

Literature
The Road (London book), a 1907 memoir by Jack London
The Road, or The Ten Commandments, a 1931 novel by Warwick Deeping
The Road (Anand novel), a 1961 novel by Mulk Raj Anand
The Road, a 1965 play by Wole Soyinka
The Road: Stories, Journalism, and Essays, a 1987 book by Vasily Grossman
The Road, a 2010 novel in the Being Human series by Simon Guerrier

Music

Groups
 The Road (group), a late 60s group from Buffalo, New York

Albums
 The Road (Mike + The Mechanics album), 2011
 The Road (Tricia Brock album), 2011
 The Road (Aaron Lewis album), 2012
 The Road (Unkle album), 2017
 The Road (Super Junior album), 2022

Songs
 "The Road" (song), a 1988 song by The Kinks
 "The Road", a 1977 song by Jackson Browne from Running on Empty
 "The Road", a 1980 song by Jon and Vangelis from Short Stories
 "The Road", a 1984 song by Mark Knopfler from Cal
 "The Road", a 1991 song by the Levellers from Levelling the Land
 "The Road", a 2001 song by Tenacious D Tenacious D
 "The Road", a 2004 song by Matt Costa from A Brokedown Melody
 "The Road", a 2004 song by Superheist
 "The Road", a 2009 song by Frank Turner from Poetry of the Deed
 "The Road", a 2014 song by Alistair Griffin from From Nowhere
 "The Road", a 2020 song by Faouzia

See also
 On the Road (disambiguation)
 Road (disambiguation)
 Roud (disambiguation)